Danny Joe Pohl (born April 1, 1955) is an American professional golfer who has played on the PGA Tour and the Champions Tour. He won two PGA Tour tournaments (the 1986 Colonial in a 1-hole playoff win against Payne Stewart and the 1986 World Series of Golf at Firestone Country Club) by 1 stroke over Lanny Wadkins and tied Craig Stadler for first place in the 1982 Masters Tournament before losing in a playoff. Pohl competed for his country as a member of the 1987 Ryder Cup team at Muirfield Village Golf Club.

Amateur career
Born and raised in Mt. Pleasant, Michigan, Pohl attended the University of Arizona in Tucson, and played for the Wildcats' golf team. He was inducted into the Arizona Sports Hall of Fame in 1985. He is considered the greatest athlete ever produced by Mt. Pleasant High School, where he has been inducted into its Athletic Hall of Fame, earning All State honors in three sports (golf, baseball and basketball). He played high school golf for Steve Robbins, father of 9-time LPGA winner Kelly Robbins, who also coached PGA Tour player Doug LaBelle II and LPGA player Cindy Figg, all of whom followed Pohl. As a prep baseball player, Pohl was scouted by Major League teams and considered a top prospect as a pitcher/shortstop/outfielder going 10-0 as a pitcher his senior year in high school. He was a star point guard on a prep basketball team that went undefeated (20-0) during his senior season. He twice won the Michigan Amateur Golf Championship (1975 and 1977). He was inducted into the Michigan Golf Hall of Fame in 2004.

Professional career
Pohl turned pro in 1977 and joined the PGA Tour in 1978. He won two tournaments on the PGA Tour during his career both of which came in 1986, when he finished fifth on the money list: the Colonial National Invitation and the NEC World Series of Golf. Pohl had 70 top-10 finishes including more than a dozen second or third-place finishes. A highly ranked player in the world, his career was still ascending in 1987 when he posted the lowest scoring average on the PGA Tour and won the Vardon Trophy. The following year, Pohl began to suffer a series of injuries starting with low back surgery in 1987 that dramatically altered his competitiveness.

Pohl has seven top-10 finishes in major tournaments. His best finish in a major was 2nd at the 1982 Masters Tournament which he lost to Craig Stadler in a playoff. He also had a third-place finish at the 1981 PGA Championship and a T-3 at the 1982 U.S. Open.

In 1980, Pohl led the tour in driving average at 274.1 yards, and again in 1981 with a 280.1 yard average. He was a member of the 1987 Ryder Cup Team. He won the Vardon Trophy in 1987 and was inducted into the Michigan Golf Hall of Fame in May 2004.

Since turning 50 in April 2005, Pohl has played on the Champions Tour. His best finish at this level has been a T-3 at the 2005 Commerce Bank Long Island Classic.

Amateur wins
1975 Michigan Amateur
1977 Michigan Amateur

Professional wins (3)

PGA Tour wins (2)

*Note: The 1986 Colonial National Invitation was shortened to 54 holes due to rain.

PGA Tour playoff record (1–2)

Other wins (1)
1988 Pebble Beach National Pro-Am Championship (with Dan Marino)

Results in major championships

CUT = missed the half-way cut
"T" indicates a tie for a place

Summary

Most consecutive cuts made – 8 (1987 U.S. Open – 1989 PGA)
Longest streak of top-10s – 3 (1981 PGA – 1982 U.S. Open)

Results in The Players Championship

CUT = missed the halfway cut
WD = withdrew
"T" indicates a tie for a place

U.S. national team appearances
Nissan Cup: 1986
Ryder Cup: 1987

See also 

 Spring 1978 PGA Tour Qualifying School graduates
Spring 1979 PGA Tour Qualifying School graduates

References

External links

American male golfers
Arizona Wildcats men's golfers
PGA Tour golfers
PGA Tour Champions golfers
Ryder Cup competitors for the United States
Golfers from Michigan
People from Mount Pleasant, Michigan
Golfers from Phoenix, Arizona
1955 births
Living people